Alexis Tony Louis Elie Lestiennes Khazzaka (born 15 April 1994) is a Lebanese former footballer who played as a midfielder. Born in France, he represented Lebanon at international level.

International career
Khazzaka played twice for Lebanon national team in 2013. He made his competitive debut on 26 March 2013, entering as an 82nd-minute substitute in the 2014 World Cup qualifier against Uzbekistan.

Khazzaka also represented the national under-23 team at the 2016 AFC U-23 Championship qualification, scoring a brace against the Maldives.

Personal life 
In 2012, Khazzaka participated in "The Chance", an initiative by Nike aimed at uncovering young players around the world and giving them the possibility of being scouted by a professional club. Khazzaka passed the regional qualifiers as one of the best three players from the Middle East, and was selected among the 100 finalists. He eventually finished among the best 52 players.

See also
 List of Lebanon international footballers born outside Lebanon

References

External links
 
 
 
 

1994 births
Living people
Sportspeople from Blois
Footballers from Centre-Val de Loire
Lebanese footballers
Association football midfielders
Akhaa Ahli Aley FC players
Lebanese Premier League players
Lebanese Second Division players
Lebanon youth international footballers
Lebanon international footballers